Étienne Lesbats (born 7 August 1887, date of death unknown) was a French rower. He competed in the men's eight event at the 1912 Summer Olympics.

References

1887 births
Year of death missing
French male rowers
Olympic rowers of France
Rowers at the 1912 Summer Olympics
Sportspeople from Bayonne